Niphates is a genus of sea sponges belonging to the family Niphatidae. It is native to the Florida Keys, The Bahamas, and the Caribbean including the Netherlands Antilles and China seas. It also found in the Saint Martin's island of the Bay of Bengal, Bangladesh.

References 

Haplosclerida
Sponge genera